Erum may refer to:
 Erum (name), Muslim name
 Episodic random utility model, a statistical model used for regression analysis.